Peter Metelerkamp was a South African flying ace of World War II, credited with 5 'kills'.

Born in England, his parents returned to South Africa and lived in Knysna.
He joined the Special Service Battalion in 1936 before moving to the Military College. He went on to join the South African Air Force, qualifying as a pilot in 1938. He joined 1 Squadron SAAF in March 1942, in the Western Desert, flying Hurricanes

He was injured during the Battle of Alam el Halfa and was hospitalised. He returned to the squadron in November 1942, transitioning to Spitfires. He was appointed Officer Commanding on 13 November.

He was killed on 13 December when his aircraft was hit and he crashed into the sea. He was buried at Benghazi War Cemetery.

References

South African World War II flying aces
1918 births
1942 deaths
South African military personnel of World War II
South African military personnel killed in World War II
Aviators killed by being shot down
South African expatriates in the United Kingdom